Dubosiella is a Gram-positive genus from the family of Erysipelotrichidae with one known species (Dubosiella newyorkensis). Dubosiella newyorkensis has been isolated from the intestinal content of a murine from New York City in the United States. Dubosiella is named after the American microbiologist René Dubos.

See also
 List of bacterial orders
 List of bacteria genera

References 

Erysipelotrichia
Bacteria genera
Taxa described in 2017
Monotypic bacteria genera